The 2010 Bank Austria-TennisTrophy was a tennis tournament to be played on indoor hard courts. It was the 36th edition of the event known that year as the Bank Austria-TennisTrophy, and part of the ATP World Tour 250 Series of the 2010 ATP World Tour. It was held at the Wiener Stadthalle in Vienna, Austria, from October 23 through October 31, 2010.

Entrants

Seeds

 Seeds are based on the rankings of October 18, 2010.

Other entrants
The following players received wildcards into the singles main draw:
  James Blake
  Martin Fischer
  Thomas Muster

The following players received entry from the qualifying draw:
  Matthias Bachinger
  Marsel İlhan
  Andrej Martin
  Grega Žemlja

The following player received entry as a Lucky loser into the singles main draw:
  Andreas Haider-Maurer

Finals

Singles

 Jürgen Melzer defeated  Andreas Haider-Maurer 6–7(10–12), 7–6(7–4), 6–4
It was Melzer's first title of the year and 3rd of his career. He defended his title.

Doubles

 Daniel Nestor /  Nenad Zimonjić defeated  Mariusz Fyrstenberg /  Marcin Matkowski, 7–5, 3–6, [10–5]

References

External links
 Official website
 ATP tournament profile

2010 ATP World Tour
2010
Vienna